Torre Río Real is a tower in Marbella, southern Spain, built in 1575.

Like other beacon towers along the Mediterranean coast of Andalusia, the tower was part of a surveillance system used by the coast and Christian Arabs. Also like the other towers, it has been declared Bien de Interés Cultural.

References
Castillosnet.org

Infrastructure completed in 1575
Towers completed in the 16th century
Buildings and structures in Marbella
Rio Real